Vladimir Gregoryevich "Goskino" Barsky ((1866–1936), was a Russian and Soviet director, screenwriter, actor and author of articles about theater.

He took part in the formation of the Turkmen and Uzbek cinematography.

Biography 
He was born in 1866 in Moscow to a Russian family. He graduated from the Moscow real school (1885) and Imperial Moscow Technical School.

He started directing and acting in 1892 in a number of theaters. In 1899–1917, he worked as a director and actor of a drama theater in Ivanovo. In 1917–1921, he worked in the People's House in Tbilisi.

In 1921–1928 he was a director of the State Committee for Industry of Georgia, After 1928, he worked at film studios Sovkino, Mezhrabpomfilm, Uzbekkino, and Turkmenfilm.

He died on January 24, 1936, and is buried in Moscow.

Creativity 
Together with the scriptwriter G. Arustanov he worked on a series of films under the general title "Iron penal servitude", which were supposed to show the revolutionary past of Georgia. Two films were made: "Nightmares of the Past" (1925), which tells about the events of 1905 in Georgia, and "At the Cost of Thousands" (1925), which is about the events of 1916–1917 in Georgia.

Selected filmography

Actor 
 Battleship Potemkin -  Golikov, commander 
 The Ninth Wave -  Officer 
 Clockwork bug -  Jean, hairdresser, he's Uncle Vanya 
 Merchants of glory -  Major Blanchard , in the credits - G. Barsky
 Shakir (film) -  colonist 
 Nastenka Ustinova -  Sudarikov 
 Pepo -  judge

Director 
 Decapitated Corpse
 Tell me why? ..
Fire Worshipers
 Don't Sleep
 Exile
 Rogue Arsen
 Iron hard labor
 Nightmares of the Past
 Lighthouse Mystery
 Costing thousands
 The Ninth Wave
 Princess Mary
 Bela
 Maksim Maksimych
Cossacks
Gul and Tolmaz (not completed)

Screenwriter 
 Tell me why? ..
 Do not sleep
 Fire worshipers
 Rogue Arsen
The Mystery of the Lighthouse
Princess Mary
 Bela
 Maxim Maksimych
 Cossacks

External links 
 Vladimir Barsky
 Buried in Columbarium No. 9 of the New Don Cemetery

References

1866 births
1936 deaths
Male screenwriters
Russian film directors
Silent film directors
Soviet film directors
Soviet screenwriters
20th-century Russian screenwriters
20th-century Russian male writers